hostapd (host access point daemon) is a user space daemon software enabling a network interface card to act as an access point and authentication server. There are three implementations: Jouni Malinen's hostapd, OpenBSD's hostapd and Devicescape's hostapd.

Jouni Malinen's hostapd 

Jouni Malinen's hostapd is a user space daemon for access point and authentication servers. It can be used to create a wireless hotspot using a Linux computer.  It implements IEEE 802.11 access point management, IEEE 802.1X/WPA/WPA2/EAP Authenticators, RADIUS client, EAP server, and RADIUS authentication server. The current version supports Linux (Host AP, MadWifi, Prism54 and some of the drivers which use the kernel's mac80211 subsystem), QNX,  FreeBSD (net80211), and DragonFlyBSD.

OpenBSD's hostapd 

OpenBSD's hostapd is a user space daemon that helps to improve roaming and monitoring of OpenBSD-based wireless networks. It implements Inter Access Point Protocol (IAPP) for exchanging station association information between access points. It can trigger a set of actions like frame injection or logging when receiving specified IEEE 802.11 frames.

Devicescape's hostapd 

The Open Wireless Linux version of hostapd. It is kept as close as possible to the original open source release, but with OWL specific packaging and defaults.
The website appears to be dead (April 2013), probably as the project itself.

See also 
 HostAP

References

External links 
DragonFlyBSD commit
Undeadly Article
 

Wi-Fi
OpenBSD